World Red Cross and Red Crescent Day is an annual celebration of the principles of the International Red Cross and Red Crescent Movement. World Red Cross Red Crescent Day is celebrated on 8 May each year. This date is the anniversary of the birth of Jean-Henry Dunant, who was born on 8 May 1828. He was the founder of International Committee of the Red Cross (ICRC) and the recipient of the first Nobel Peace Prize.

History
The idea for an "annual action that could take hold in the whole world ... that would be a major contribution to peace" was introduced just after World War I. This initiative, known as the "Red Cross Truce", was studied by an International Commission established at the 14th International Conference of the Red Cross. Its report, presented to the 15th International Conference of the Red Cross in Tokyo in 1934, was approved. It was only after World War II, in 1946, that the Tokyo proposal was studied by the League of Red Cross Societies (LRCS), renamed the International Federation of Red Cross and Red Crescent Societies (IFRC) in 1991. Two years later, having considered the principles of the truce and its applicability across different regions of the world, the proposal of an annual International Red Cross Day was adopted and the first Red Cross Day was celebrated on 8 May 1948. The official title of the day changed over time, and became "World Red Cross and Red Crescent Day" in 1984.

References

External links 
 International Committee of the Red Cross: World Red Cross and Red Crescent Day
 British Red Cross 

International observances
International Red Cross and Red Crescent Movement
May observances